{{DISPLAYTITLE:C17H16O4}}

The molecular formula C17H16O4 (exact mass : 284.104859, molar mass : 284.31 g/mol) may refer to :
 Caffeic acid phenethyl ester, a derivative of caffeic acid
 Flavokavain B, a flavokavain found in the kava plant